The World Chess Championship 2023 is an upcoming chess match, taking place from 7 April to 1 May 2023 to determine the new world chess champion. It will be held in Astana, Kazakhstan.

The incumbent champion Magnus Carlsen decided not to defend his title against Ian Nepomniachtchi, the winner of the Candidates Tournament 2022. Therefore, Nepomniachtchi will play the second-place finisher in the Candidates, Ding Liren, in the World Chess Championship match.

The pre-match head-to-head score between Nepomniachtchi and Ding in classical games is: 3 wins for Nepomniachtchi, 2 wins for Ding, with 8 draws.

Carlsen declines to defend the title 

The incumbent world champion was Magnus Carlsen, who had won the title in 2013. To keep the title, Carlsen was periodically required to defend it in a Chess World Championship match against a challenger, determined by a Candidates Tournament. Carlsen successfully defended the title in the world championship matches of 2014, 2016, 2018 and 2021. In December 2021, soon after the 2021 championship (against Ian Nepomniachtchi), Carlsen stated that he was lacking motivation and might not defend his title again, unless the challenger were Alireza Firouzja. Firouzja had risen to number two in the world rankings in 2021 at the age of 18. In April 2022, Carlsen again publicly stated that he was unlikely to play in the next world championship, this time without mentioning any potential opponent.

The Candidates Tournament 2022 concluded in early July 2022, with Nepomniachtchi as its winner. FIDE and Carlsen were already in talks regarding the world championship match and its format. On 20 July, Carlsen announced that he would not defend his title. Therefore the 2023 world championship match will be between Ian Nepomniachtchi and Ding Liren, respectively the winner and runner up of the 2022 Candidates Tournament, with Carlsen set to lose the title of world champion when the match concludes. After Carlsen formally confirmed his decision in writing, FIDE officially invited Ding and Nepomniachtchi to participate in the 2023 world championship.

Non-participation by the incumbent champion is a rare situation. From 1993–2005 there were two rival world championships operating simultaneously. Outside that period, the last reigning champion who declined to take part was Bobby Fischer in 1975. In that case, FIDE awarded the title to Fischer's challenger, Anatoly Karpov, without a match being played (Karpov had qualified through a knock-out tournament, defeating Viktor Korchnoi in the final). The last time an undisputed world championship was actually played without the defending champion was in 1948, because the previous champion Alexander Alekhine had died in 1946.

Format 

The match will be held in Astana, Kazakhstan, from 7 April to 1 May 2023. It will be a 14-game match, with players alternating the white and black pieces. If the match is drawn, a series of rapid games will be used as a tie-breaker. The time control will be 120 minutes for the first 40 moves, 60 minutes for the next 20 moves, and 15 minutes for the remainder, plus an increment of 30 seconds per move beginning at move 61. The same format was used for the previous world championship in 2021.

The prize fund will be €2 million, split 60% for the winning player and 40% for the loser.

Candidates Tournament 2022 

The challengers are Ian Nepomniachtchi and Ding Liren, who qualified as the winner and runner-up, respectively, in the Candidates Tournament 2022, which began on June 16 and ended on July 5, 2022. Nepomniachtchi had previously challenged world champion Carlsen in the previous World Chess Championship 2021.

The participants were:

Results

Notes

References

2023
2023 in chess
Chess World Championship 2023
April 2023 sports events in Asia
May 2023 sports events in Asia
2023 in Kazakhstani sport